Dicheniotes acclivis is a species of tephritid or fruit flies in the genus Dicheniotes of the family Tephritidae.

Distribution
Uganda.

References

Tephritinae
Insects described in 1947
Diptera of Africa